The Ciubota is a right tributary of the river Tutova in Romania. It flows into the Tutova in Iezer.

References

Rivers of Romania
Rivers of Vaslui County